"Easy" is the fourth single from Paula DeAnda's self-titled album.

Song information
The album version features rapper Lil Wayne, but many radio stations play the single version, which replaces Wayne with Bow Wow. A Spanish version of the song, "Facil", exists; it only has her vocals without Bow Wow or Lil Wayne. (Facil means easy in Spanish.) It is included in the bonus edition of her album Paula DeAnda.

Chart information
"Easy" peaked at #64 on the U.S. Billboard Hot 100 and it spent a total number of 11 weeks on the Hot 100. Its final position was #90 during the charting week of September 22, 2007.

Music video

The video was shot by Billie Woodruff. It was shown for the first time on television on TRL on July 18. The video features appearances by Baby Bash, Wilmer Valderrama, Bow Wow's artist Khleo Thomas, and Bow Wow himself. In the video, DeAnda can be seen applying make up and driving around in an Aston Martin, being chased continually by men. She shows off her more glamorous side for the first time in this video.

TRL mutes the word "gun" out of the video which interrupts the correct instrumental.

Track listing

Promo single
 "Easy" (feat. Lil Wayne) (Original version)
 "Easy" (Instrumental)

U.S. single
 "Easy" (feat. Lil Wayne) (Original version)
 "Easy" (feat. Bow Wow) (Released single version)

Remixes
 "Fácil (Easy)"(Spanish version)
 "Easy" (Aspuration Remix Edit)
 "Easy" (Nu Shooz Mix) (Remixed by The Flyntstones)

Personnel
Danja – producer
Timbaland – additional production
Mad Scientist – vocal production
Marcella "Ms. Lago" Araica – engineering, mixing

Chart performance

References

2007 singles
Paula DeAnda songs
Bow Wow (rapper) songs
Song recordings produced by Danja (record producer)
Music videos directed by Bille Woodruff
Songs written by Lil Wayne
Songs written by Danja (record producer)
Sony BMG singles
Arista Records singles
2006 songs

simple:Easy (Paula DeAnda song)